Nocardioides dubius is a Gram-positive bacterium from the genus Nocardioides which has been isolated from alkaline soil in Kwangchun, Korea.

References

Further reading

External links
Type strain of Nocardioides dubius at BacDive -  the Bacterial Diversity Metadatabase	

dubius
Bacteria described in 2005